Self Portrait is the tenth studio album by American singer-songwriter Bob Dylan, released on June 8, 1970, by Columbia Records.

Self Portrait was Dylan's second double album (after Blonde on Blonde), and features many cover versions of well-known pop and folk songs. Also included are a handful of instrumentals and original compositions. Most of the album is sung in the affected country crooning voice that Dylan had introduced a year earlier on Nashville Skyline. Seen by some as intentionally surreal and even satirical at times, Self Portrait received extremely poor reviews.

Dylan has stated in interviews that Self Portrait was something of a joke, far below the standards he set in the 1960s, and was made to end the "spokesman of a generation" label that critics had put on him.

Despite the negative critical reception, the album quickly went gold in the US, where it hit No. 4, and was also a UK No. 1 hit. The album saw a retrospective positive re-evaluation with the release of The Bootleg Series Vol. 10: Another Self Portrait (1969–1971) in 2013.

Production 
The motives behind Self Portrait have been subject to wild speculation and great debate.

Critic Robert Shelton was under the impression that Self Portrait was intended as a serious release. "I told Dylan that Self Portrait confused me," Shelton wrote in 1986. "Why had he recorded 'Blue Moon'? He wouldn't be drawn out, although obviously he had been stung by the criticism. 'It was an expression,' he said. He indicated that if the album had come from Presley or the Everly Brothers, who veered toward the middle of the road, it wouldn't have shocked so many."

However, in a Rolling Stone interview, in 1984, Dylan gave a different reason for the album's release:

As to why he chose to release a double album, Dylan replied, "Well, it wouldn’t have held up as a single album–then it really would’ve been bad, you know. I mean, if you’re gonna put a lot of crap on it, you might as well load it up!"

Later, Cameron Crowe interviewed Dylan for his liner notes to 1985's Biograph, a boxed-set retrospective of Dylan's career. When asked about Self Portrait, Dylan added more details to the story:

Later interviews only echoed the sentiments expressed to Crowe.

Songs 
Certain tracks have drawn praise over the years. One of them is written by Alfred Frank Beddoe (who was "discovered" by Pete Seeger after applying for work at People’s Songs, Inc. in 1946), "Copper Kettle" captures an idyllic backwoods existence, where moonshine is equated not only with pleasure but with tax resistance. Appalachian farmers who struggled to make their living off the land would routinely siphon off a percentage of their corn in order to distill whiskey. Everything produced would then be hidden from the government in order to avoid the whiskey tax of 1791.

Clinton Heylin writes, "'Copper Kettle'...strike[s] all the right chords...being one of the most affecting performances in Dylan's entire official canon." Music critic Tim Riley called it "an ingenious Appalachian zygote for rock attitudes, the hidden source of John Wesley Hardings shadows."

"Copper Kettle" was popularised by Joan Baez and appeared on her best-selling 1962 LP Joan Baez in Concert.

Among the original songs written for the album, the instrumental "Wigwam" later achieved recognition for its use in the 2001 Wes Anderson film The Royal Tenenbaums. "Living the Blues" was later covered by Leon Redbone. "Living the Blues" was also covered by the Jamie Saft Trio with Antony Hegarty on the album Trouble: The Jamie Saft Trio Plays Bob Dylan, in 2006. "All the Tired Horses" only features two lines, and is sung only by a female backing group. The song featured in the 2001 film Blow.

One of the live songs on the album is the party-friendly romp "The Mighty Quinn (Quinn the Eskimo)," originally recorded at the 1967 Basement Tapes sessions and covered to great success by Manfred Mann in 1968. For live venues, the Grateful Dead and Phish made the song an iconic favorite. The version on Self Portrait, however, is a soundboard-sourced live performance from Dylan and the Band's Isle of Wight Festival concert (as are three other tracks on the album).

Reception 

Self Portrait received negative reviews by critics and consumers alike. Critical disdain seemed universal. At best, a number of journalists, including Robert Christgau, felt there was a concept behind Self Portrait that had some merit.

"Conceptually, this is a brilliant album," wrote Christgau, "which is organized, I think, by two central ideas. First, that 'self' is most accurately defined (and depicted) in terms of the artifacts—in this case, pop tunes and folk songs claimed as personal property and semispontaneous renderings of past creations frozen for posterity on a piece of tape and (perhaps) even a couple of songs one has written oneself—to which one responds. Second, that the people's music is the music people like, Mantovani strings and all."

However, few critics expressed any interest in the music itself. "[I]n order for a concept to work it has to be supported musically—that is, you have to listen," Christgau admitted. "I don't know anyone, even vociferous supporters of this album, who plays more than one side at a time. I don't listen to it at all. The singing is not consistently good, though it has its moments, and the production—for which I blame Bob Johnston, though Dylan has to be listed as a coconspirator—ranges from indifferent to awful. It is possible to use strings and soprano choruses well, but Johnston has never demonstrated the knack. Other points: it's overpriced, the cover art is lousy, and it sounds good on WMCA."

In his Rolling Stone review (with its memorably vitriolic opening line, "What is this shit?"), Greil Marcus warned, "Unless [Dylan] returns to the marketplace, with a sense of vocation and the ambition to keep up with his own gifts, the music of [the mid-sixties] will continue to dominate his records, whether he releases them or not." He also commented, "I once said I'd buy an album of Dylan breathing heavily. I still would. But not an album of Dylan breathing softly." In a 1971 telephone interview with journalist A.J. Weberman, Dylan can be heard responding angrily to the Marcus review, while attempting to defend larger accusations of perceived non-committal politics.

A rare dissenting positive voice about the album was Marc Bolan, soon to become a star as lead singer/guitarist of English glam rock band T.Rex, at this point in its earlier incarnation as hippy acoustic duo Tyrannosaurus Rex.  Appalled at the negative reviews directed at the album, Bolan wrote a letter in its defence to the 11 July 1970 edition of Melody Maker:

Rock critics Jimmy Guterman and Owen O'Donnell, in their 1991 book The Worst Rock and Roll Records of All Time, listed Self-Portrait as the third worst rock album ever, with only Lou Reed's experimental Metal Machine Music and Elvis Presley's concert byplay album Having Fun with Elvis on Stage faring worse. "The breakup of the Beatles shortly before this album's release," they wrote, "signaled the end of the sixties; Self-Portrait suggested the end of Bob Dylan."

In 1973, Knopf published Dylan's song lyrics, sketches, and album notes as Writings and Drawings, with updated versions called Lyrics appearing in 1985 and 2000. In all three editions, the original lyrics from Self Portrait are never acknowledged, suggesting Dylan's disavowal of the whole album to that time. However, the lyrics to "Living the Blues" and "Minstrel Boy" are included, listed as extra songs from the Nashville Skyline sessions; the 2004 edition includes them under their own entry and Dylan's current website includes the release together with lyrics and download links.

Dylan revisited Self Portrait on The Bootleg Series Vol. 10: Another Self Portrait (1969–1971) in 2013.

Track listing

Personnel 

Bob Dylan – guitar, harmonica, keyboards, vocals
Byron Bach – cello
Brenton Banks – violin
George Binkley III – violin
Norman Blake – guitar
David Bromberg – guitar, dobro, bass guitar
Albert Wynn Butler – clarinet, saxophone
Kenneth A. Buttrey – drums, percussion
Fred Carter Jr. – guitar
Marvin Chantry – viola
Ron Cornelius – guitar
Charlie Daniels – bass guitar, guitar
Rick Danko – bass guitar, vocals
Pete Drake – steel guitar
Dolores Edgin – vocals
Fred Foster – guitar
Solie Fott – violin, viola
Bubba Fowler – guitar
Dennis Good – trombone
Emanuel Green – violin
Hilda Harris – vocals
Levon Helm – mandolin, drums, vocals
Freddie Hill – trumpet
Karl Himmel – clarinet, saxophone, trombone
Garth Hudson – keyboards
Lilian Hunt – violin
Martin Katahn – violin
Doug Kershaw – violin
Al Kooper – guitar, horn, keyboards
Sheldon Kurland – violin
Richard Manuel – piano, vocals
Martha McCrory – cello
Charlie McCoy – guitar, bass guitar, harmonica, vibes
Barry McDonald – violin
Tony Terran – trumpet
Ollie Mitchell – trumpet
Carol Montgomery – vocals
Bob Moore – bass guitar
Gene A. Mullins – baritone horn
Joe Osborn – guitar, bass guitar
June Page – vocals
Rex Peer – trombone
Bill Pursell – piano
Robbie Robertson – guitar, vocals
Albertine Robinson – vocals
Al Rogers – drums
Frank Smith – trombone
Maeretha Stewart – vocals
Gary Vanosdale – viola
Bill Walker – arrangements
Bob Wilson – organ, piano
Stu Woods – bass guitar

Technical
Don Puluse, Glyn Johns, Neil Wilburn - engineer
Ron Coro - design
Al Clayton, John Cohen, Camera Press - photography
Bob Dylan - cover painting

Charts

Weekly charts

Singles

Certifications

References 

Guterman, Jimmy and O'Donnell, Owen, The Worst Rock and Roll Records of All Time, Citadel, 1991.

External links 
 

1970 albums
Bob Dylan albums
Albums produced by Bob Johnston
Columbia Records albums
Covers albums
Albums with cover art by Bob Dylan